Daviesia filipes is a species of flowering plant in the family Fabaceae and is endemic to Queensland. It is a shrub with hairy foliage, crowded, narrowly oblong phyllodes, and yellow and maroon flowers.

Description

Taxonomy and naming
Daviesia filipes was first formally described in 1848 by George Bentham in Thomas Mitchell's Journal of an Expedition into the Interior of Tropical Australia. The specific epithet (filipes) means "thread-footed".

In 2017, Michael Crisp and Gregory T. Chandler described two subspecies and the names are accepted by the Australian Plant Census:
 Daviesia filipes Benth. subsp. filipes;
 Daviesia filipes subsp. terminalis Crisp & G.Chandler differs from the autonym in having flowers in racemes or Panicles on the ends of branches.

Distribution and habitat
This species of pea grows in open forest or woodland from near the Windsor Tablelands to Inglewood in Queensland. Subspecies terminalis is restricted to the drier slopes of the ranges in the Wet Tropics.

References

filipes
Flora of Queensland
Plants described in 1848
Taxa named by George Bentham